The Ritz was a six-part BBC television series that aired in 1987. It was a comedy/drama set in a nightclub, where three bouncers—Chike played by Paul Rider, Skodge played by Andrew Dunn and Kenny played by Andrew Livingstone—helped to protect the newly formed Ritz night club from a rival club owner, Mad Mick, played by Richard Ridings.

Production
The series was written and co-directed by John Godber; his co-director was Martin Shardlow and was based on John Godber's stage play 'Bouncers'.  The series also spawned a one episode spin-off called The Continental.

Andrew Dunn later starred in Victoria Wood's sitcom Dinnerladies as Canteen Manager Tony, his fellow Ritz bouncers both made one-off appearances in the series, Paul Rider as the escaped criminal The Blender in the episode "Fog" and Andrew Livingstone played Norman the agoraphobic breadman in one first series episode "Monday".

Episode guide

Episode 1: 'Monday – Grand Opening Night: Eric's Dream' (first aired: 24 April 1987)
Eric has sunk all his redundancy money into buying The Ritz disco, unaware that the previous owners lasted a mere five hours due to intimidation from the rival local disco-owner, Mad Mick and his entourage.

Episode 2: 'Tuesday – Women Free Night: Skodge's Nightmare' (first aired: 1 May 1987)
Cheryl the box office girl arrives and causes quite a stir. Eric is not sure of Skodge's motives and becomes less so during the evening. He discovers that Elaine is Mad Mick's girlfriend.

Episode 3: 'Wednesday – Over Twenty-Five's Night: Chike's Nightmare' (first aired: 8 May 1987)
The Ritz throbs to the hits of yesteryear, with Chike on the door as bouncer, but he has family problems.

Episode 4: 'Thursday – Page Three Night' (first aired: 15 May 1987)
Gorgeous Gary is late, and not so gorgeous when he arrives. Carol wonders if she's on the shelf at 24. Tony, unfulfilled by the role of chef, itches to show his hidden talents. Eric, his brain teeming with ideas, has booked a special attraction.

Episode 5: 'Friday – Fancy Dress Night: Kenny's Nightmare' (first aired: 22 May 1987)
Tonight is fancy dress night down at the Ritz and Kenny is determined to find a woman. Will this be Kenny's night to find romance?

Episode 6: 'Saturday – St Valentine's Day Dance' (first aired: 29 May 1987)
To conclude an action-packed week at the Ritz, a night of hearts and flowers. But the tension mounts. Eric feels certain that Mad Mick's arrival is imminent. But when will he come and what will he do when he arrives?

References

External links
 The official website of John Godber
 

BBC television dramas
1987 British television series debuts
1987 British television series endings
1980s British comedy-drama television series
English-language television shows